Caloptilia camaronae is a moth of the family Gracillariidae. It is known from Colombia.

The larvae feed on Uva camarona. They mine the leaves of their host plant.

References

camaronae
Gracillariidae of South America
Moths described in 1877